Vijay Kashyap is an Indian actor, known for his role in films like Gandhi, Famous Doordarshan TV series Tenali Rama

Partial television 

 Yeh Jo Hai Zindagi (1984) - Tarun Bhattacharya
 Tenali Rama (1990) - Tenali Rama
 Dhadkan Zindagi Kii (2021) - 
 The Edge Malgudi Days (1987)- 
Kundali Bhagya (2017) - Zee Tv

Partial filmography 

 Gandhi (1982) - Apte
 Ardh Satya (1983) - Union Leader
 Party (1984) - Guest
 Saaransh (1984) - Dr. Bhatt
 Mohan Joshi Hazir Ho! (1984) - Chawl Tenant 4
 Giddh (1984) - Katra
 Nasoor (1985)
 Aghaat (1985)
 Tan-Badan (1986)
 Bhagwaan Dada (1986) - Michael D'Costa
 New Delhi Times (1986) - Mehku miya
 Wasta (1989)
 Nocturne indien (1989) - La réceptionniste de l'hôtel Mandovi
 Drishti (1990) - Ramesh
 Diksha (1991) - Manjunath
 Karamati Coat (1993) - Magan
 Aaja Meri Jaan (1993)
 Little Buddha (1993) - Vizir
 Triyacharitra (1994)
 Barsaat (1995) - Kapurchand (College Principal)
 Tarpan The Absolution (1995) - Phatto
 English Babu Desi Mem (1996)
 Dillagi (1999)
 Hum To Mohabbat Karega (2000) - Havaldar Rokde
 Nayee Padosan (2003) - Shastri Iyengar
 Swami (2007) - Muthu - Swami's friend
 Milenge Milenge (2010) - Premsing
 F.A.L.T.U (2011) - Nair
 Arjun: The Warrior Prince (2012) - Shakuni (voice)
 Psycho (2013) - Meera's Father
 Divana-e-Ishq (2013)
 Take It Easy (2015)
 Jai Ho! Democracy (2015) - Khurram Razak Cheema

References

External links 
 

Indian male television actors
Year of birth missing (living people)
Living people
Indian male film actors
20th-century Indian male actors